Herman Witkam (born 19 March 1985) is a Dutch composer and multi-instrumentalist, best known for his scores to motion pictures. During his studies at the Utrecht School of the Arts, Witkam worked on a number of online shorts through the DVXUser online film festivals. For two of these films, Rekindled and A Little Mouth to Feed, both directed by Jack Daniel Stanley, Witkam won awards at the Shriekfest and HollyShorts Film Festival respectively.

Career
After graduating, Witkam started working mainly on feature films and television drama, but also documentaries, such as Eric Walter's My Amityville Horror, which screened at the BFI London Film Festival and Fantastic Fest, and was named one of the top 15 festival horror films of 2012 by Bloody Disgusting. The Dutch mobile phone thriller APP, for which Witkam composed a hybrid score of orchestra and electronics was released in a limited theatrical run in the US on May 9, 2014, and uses audio digital watermarking technology to give viewers a fully integrated second screen that complements the film. Witkam also scored the youth drama Spijt (Regret), which received grand prizes at the Giffoni Film Festival, the Toronto International Film Festival's TIFF Kids and the European Film Award in the youth category, amongst a total of around 30 festival awards worldwide.

Ethnic Instruments
Witkam frequently uses traditional musical instruments like the Armenian duduk and Japanese shakuhachi in his work, which he performs himself, often using improvisation as a composing technique. As a multi-instrumentalist, Herman has performed on video game titles such as Mortal Kombat 11, Total War Rome II and Dungeons & Dragons Tactics, and internationally co-produced pictures such as The Seven of Daran: Battle of Pareo Rock and The King Maker.

Selected filmography

Awards and nominations

Awards
2010 HollyShorts Film Festival - Best music - A Little Mouth to Feed
2010 Shriekfest - Best Music - Rekindled
2011 Eindhoven Film Festival - Best Music - Prosopagnosia

Nominations
2008 Action On Film International Film Festival Best Music - Berlin

References

External links 

 
 
 Score Magazine Interview (in Dutch)

Dutch film score composers
Male film score composers
Living people
1985 births